Alocasia brancifolia is a species of flowering plant in the family Araceae, native to the Moluccas and New Guinea. With its heavily dissected leaves it is sometimes kept as a houseplant. There appears to be a cultivar, 'Pink Passion', in which the markings on the petioles are pink instead of the usual brown.

References

brancifolia
House plants
Flora of the Maluku Islands
Flora of New Guinea
Plants described in 1990